Bless Me, Father is a British sitcom starring Arthur Lowe, Daniel Abineri, Gabrielle Daye, Patrick McAlinney, David Ryall, and Sheila Keith. It was aired on ITV from 1978 until 1981 and described the adventures of an Irish Catholic priest, Father Charles Duddleswell (Lowe) and his young curate (Abineri) in the fictional parish of St. Jude's in suburban London. Twenty-one episodes, written by Peter De Rosa (who had previously been a novice curate), were aired. De Rosa wrote the books on which the series was based using the pseudonym of Neil Boyd which was also the name of the young curate character; Boyd also served as the narrator in the series of novels upon which the series was based. It was made for the ITV network by London Weekend Television.

The series was set in 1950 and 1951 and marked a departure from the middle-class "bank manager" roles associated with Lowe such as that in Dad's Army. The other regular characters included Mrs Pring (Daye), the housekeeper, the hard-drinking Dr Daley (McAlinney), the non-religious neighbour Billy Buzzle (Ryall), and abbess Reverend Mother Stephen (Keith).

Cast
 Arthur Lowe as Father Charles Clement Duddleswell 
 Daniel Abineri as Father Neil Boyd
 Gabrielle Daye as Mrs. Pring
 Patrick McAlinney as Dr. Daley
 David Ryall as Billy Buzzle
 Sheila Keith as Mother Stephen

Guest appearances on the series include Derek Francis, Phoebe Nicholls, Daniel Gerroll, Peter Bowles, Clive Swift, Rynagh O'Grady, Michael Troughton, Geoffrey Palmer and Peter Copley.

Episodes

The series was repeated from March 2020 on Fox Classics.

Series 1

Series 2

Series 3

Home media
The complete series of Bless Me, Father has been released on DVD in region 1, region 2 and region 4. In the United States and Canada, "The Complete Collection" was released on 26 April 2005 from Acorn Media. In the United Kingdom, distribution company Network DVD released the complete series on 6 August 2007. In Australia, the complete series was released on 11 March 2015 via distribution company Reel DVD.

Book series
Peter De Rosa, formerly an ordained Catholic priest and lecturer, left the priesthood in 1970 and later became a full-time author.  Under the pen-name Neil Boyd he wrote the Bless Me, Father novels from which the TV series was adapted.

References

External links

Fiction set in 1950
Fiction set in 1951
1978 British television series debuts
1981 British television series endings
1970s British sitcoms
1980s British sitcoms
Christian fiction
English-language television shows
ITV sitcoms
London Weekend Television shows
Catholicism in fiction
Television shows based on British novels
Television series by ITV Studios
Television series set in the 1950s
Television shows set in London
Religious comedy television series